Metal bis(trimethylsilyl)amides (often abbreviated as metal silylamides) are coordination complexes composed of a cationic metal with anionic bis(trimethylsilyl)amide ligands and are part of a broader category of metal amides.

Due to the bulky hydrocarbon backbone metal bis(trimethylsilyl)amide complexes have low lattice energies and are lipophilic .  For this reason, they are soluble in a range of nonpolar organic solvents, in contrast to simple metal halides, which only dissolve in reactive solvents. These steric bulky complexes are molecular, consisting of mono-, di-, and tetramers. Having a built-in base, these compounds conveniently react with even weakly protic reagents. The class of ligands and pioneering studies on their coordination compounds were described by Bürger and Wannagat.

The ligands are often denoted hmds (e.g. M(N(SiMe3)2)3 = M(hmds)3) in reference to the hexamethyldisilazane from which they are prepared.

General methods of preparation 
Apart from group 1 and 2 complexes, a general method for preparing metal bis(trimethylsilyl)amides entails reactions of anhydrous metal chloride with an alkali metal bis(trimethylsilyl)amides via a salt metathesis reaction:

 MCl  +   Na(hmds)   →   M(hmds)  +   NaCl

Alkali metal chloride formed as a by-product typically precipitates as a solid, allowing for its removal by filtration. The remaining metal bis(trimethylsilyl)amide is then often purified by distillation or sublimation.

Group 1 complexes 

Lithium, sodium, and potassium bis(trimethylsilyl)amides are commercially available. When free of solvent, the lithium and sodium complexes are trimeric, and the potassium complex is dimeric in solid state.
The lithium reagent may be prepared from n-butyllithium and bis(trimethylsilyl)amine:

nBuLi + HN(SiMe3)2 → Li(hmds) + butane

The direct reaction of these molten metals with bis(trimethylsilyl)amine at high temperature has also been described:

 M + HN(SiMe3)2 → MN(SiMe3)2 + 1/2 H2

Alkali metal silylamides are soluble in a range of organic solvents, where they exist as aggregates, and are commonly used in organic chemistry as strong sterically hindered bases. They are also extensively used as precursors for the synthesis other bis(trimethylsilyl)amide complexes (see below).

Group 2 complexes 
The calcium and barium complexes may be prepared via the general method, by treating calcium iodide or barium chloride with potassium or sodium bis(trimethylsilyl)amide. However, this method can result in potassium contamination. An improved synthesis involving the reaction of benzylpotassium with calcium iodide, followed by reaction with bis(trimethylsilyl)amine results in potassium-free material:

2 BnK + CaI2 + THF → Bn2Ca(thf) + KI
Bn2Ca(thf) + 2 HN(SiMe3)2 → Ca(hmds)2 + 2 C6H5CH3 + THF

Magnesium silylamides can be prepared from dibutylmagnesium; which is commercially available as a mixture of n-Bu and s-Bu isomers. It deprotonates the free amine to yield the magnesium bis(trimethylsilyl)amide, itself commercially available.

Bu2Mg + 2 HN(SiMe3)2 → Mg(hmds)2 + 2 butane

In contrast to group 1 metals, the amine N-H in bis(trimethylsilyl)amine is not acidic enough to react with the group 2 metals, however complexes may be prepared via a reaction of tin(II) bis(trimethylsilyl)amide with the appropriate metal:

M + 2 HN(SiMe3)2  M(hmds)2 + H2 (M = Mg, Ca, Sr, Ba)
M + Sn(hmds)2 → M(hmds)2 + Sn

Long reaction times are required for this synthesis and when performed in the presence of coordinating solvents, such as dimethoxyethane, adducts are formed. Hence non-coordinating solvents such as benzene or toluene must be used to obtain the free complexes.

p-Block complexes 
Tin(II) bis(trimethylsilyl)amide is prepared from anhydrous tin(II) chloride and is commercially available. It is used to prepare other metal bis(trimethylsilylamide)s via transmetallation. The group 13 and bismuth(III) bis(trimethylsilyl)amides are prepared in the same manner; the aluminium complex may also be prepared by treating strongly basic lithium aluminium hydride with the parent amine:

 LiAlH4 + 4 HN(SiMe3)2 → Li(hmds) + Al(hmds)3 + 4 H2

An alternative synthesis of tetrasulfur tetranitride entails the use of a metal bis(trimethylsilyl)amide [(Me3Si)2N]2S as a precursor with pre-formed S–N bonds. [(Me3Si)2N]2S is prepared by the reaction of lithium bis(trimethylsilyl)amide and sulfur dichloride (SCl2).

2 [(CH3)3Si]2NLi + SCl2 → [((CH3)3Si)2N]2S + 2 LiCl

The metal bis(trimethylsilyl)amide  reacts with the combination of SCl2 and sulfuryl chloride (SO2Cl2) to form S4N4, trimethylsilyl chloride, and sulfur dioxide:

2[((CH3)3Si)2N]2S + 2SCl2 + 2SO2Cl2 →  S4N4 + 8 (CH3)3SiCl + 2SO2

The latter compound is a metal bis(trimethylsilyl)amide and can be synthesized by the reaction of selenium tetrachloride (SeCl4), selenium monochloride and lithium bis(trimethylsilyl)amide.

d-Block complexes 

In line with the general method, bis(trimethylsilyl)amides of transition metals are prepared by a reaction between the metal halides (typically chlorides) and an alkali metal bis(trimethylsilyl)amide. There is some variation however, for instance the synthesis Ti{N(SiMe3)2}3 and V{N(SiMe3)2}3 are prepared using the soluble precursors TiCl3(NMe3)2 or VCl3(NMe3)2, respectively. The melting and boiling points of the complexes decrease across the series, with Group 12 metals being sufficiently volatile to allow purification by distillation.

Iron complexes are notable for having been isolated in both the ferrous (II) and ferric (III) oxidation states. Fe[N(SiMe3)2]3 can be prepared by treating iron trichloride with lithium bis(trimethylsilyl)amide and is paramagnetic as the high spin iron(III) contains 5 unpaired electrons.
 FeCl3 + 3LiN(SiMe3)2 → Fe[N(SiMe3)2]3 + 3LiCl

Similarly, the two coordinate Fe[N(SiMe3)2]2 complex is prepared by treating iron dichloride with lithium bis(trimethylsilyl)amide:
 FeCl2 + 2LiN(SiMe3)2 → Fe[N(SiMe3)2]2 + 2LiCl

The dark green Fe[N(SiMe3)2]2 complex exists in two forms depending on its physical state. In the gas phase, the compound is a monomeric with two-coordinate Fe possessing S4 symmetry. In the solid state it forms a dimer with trigonal planar iron centers and bridging amido groups. The low coordination number of the iron complex is largely due to the steric effects of the bulky bis(trimethylsilyl)amide, however the complex will bind THF to give the adduct, {(THF)Fe[N(SiMe3)2]2}. Similar behavior can be seen in Mn(hmds)2 and Co(hmds)2, which are monomeric in the gas phase and dimeric in the crystalline phase. Group 11 complexes are especially prone to oligomerization, forming tetramers in the solid phase. The Lewis acid properties of the group 12 complexes have been reported and the improved E and C numbers for the Zn and Cd complexes are listed in the ECW model.

f-Block complexes 
Lanthanide triflates can be convenient anhydrous precursors to many bis(trimethylsilyl)amides:

 Ln(OTf)3 + 3 M(hmds) → Ln(hmds)3 + 3 MOTf (M = Li, Na, K; Ln = La, Nd, Sm, Er)

However it is more common to see the preparation of lanthanide bis(trimethylsilyl)amides from anhydrous lanthanide chlorides, as these are cheaper. The reaction is performed in THF and requires a period at reflux. Once formed, the product is separated from LiCl by exchanging the solvent for toluene, in which Ln(hmds)3 is soluble but LiCl is not.

 Ln(Cl)3 + 3 HMDS + 3 nBuLi → Ln(hmds)3 + 3 LiCl + 3 butane (Ln = La, Ce, Pr, Nd, Sm, Eu, Gd, Ho, Yb, and Lu)

Silylamides are important as starting materials in lanthanide chemistry, as lanthanide chlorides have either poor solubility or poor stability in common solvents. As a result of this nearly all lanthanide silylamides are commercially available.

There has also been some success in the synthesis and characterization of actinide bis(trimethylsilyl)amides. A convenient synthetic route uses the THF-adducts of the iodide salts AnI3(THF)4 as starting materials.

Safety 
Metal bis(trimethylsilyl)amides are strong bases. They are corrosive, and are incompatible with many chlorinated solvents. These compounds react vigorously with water, and should be manipulated with air-free technique.

References 

Coordination complexes